Aphanactis jamesoniana is a species of flowering plant in the family Asteraceae. It is found only in Ecuador. Its natural habitat is subtropical or tropical high-altitude grassland. It is threatened by habitat loss.

References

jamesoniana
Flora of Ecuador
Least concern plants
Taxonomy articles created by Polbot